Heleioporus inornatus, the plain frog, plains frog, or whooping frog, is a species of frog in the family Myobatrachidae. It is endemic to Australia. Its natural habitat is swamps.

References

inornatus
Amphibians described in 1954
Taxonomy articles created by Polbot
Frogs of Australia